The Erelu Kuti of Lagos is the traditional aristocrat charged with the bearing of the ritual essence of Oloye Erelu Kuti I, an eighteenth-century Yoruba royal who aided in the consolidation of her homeland. 

Erelu Kuti I was born the daughter of Lagos' paramount king, and was therefore the sister of his two immediate successors. Subsequently she became the consort of one of Lagos' chiefs, then thereafter a chief in her own right. She finally became Lagos' first queen mother. Her life was so entwined with the early history of her family's kingdom that her lineal descendants have gone on to serve as the ruling branch of its royal dynasty.

A Series Of Excerpts From The Oral Records Of Lagos

It is now believed by scholars of tribal history that due to Akinsemoyin's magnanimity, he did not see the need to perpetuate his branch of the dynasty by having one of his elder daughters serve as regent, pending when the eldest of his subsequent sons would come of age. As a sign of the love he had for his sister, before he died, he instead sanctioned the appointment of Ologun Kutere as his successor.

It should be stated at this juncture, however, that a different account of the history of succession has been mooted by some. It states that when Oba Akinsemoyin died, an adult son  of Gabarro named Kekere succeeded him. This Kekere was then succeeded by Ologun Kutere.

From the official genealogy of the kings of Lagos, however, it is seen that Ologun Kutere replaced Akinsemoyin in 1749. Since then, only the descendants of Ologun Kutere have been occupying the position of Oba of Lagos. The late Oba Oyekan II belonged to one of his descendant families.

Now it may be asked how Erelu Kuti came to marry Alagba and what role Akinsemoyin played in the events that led to his sister's marriage. Well, according to the narrative:

It is said that as a result of this, the Portuguese came and subsequently aided in the architectural advancement of his kingdom. This was the first contact with Europeans in this part of the world, and it heralded the advent of both Christianity and its attendant civilisations. The Portuguese built Iga Idungaran palace for Oba Akinsemoyin as a gift, a part of which is still in existence and is incorporated into the new palace.

Functions
The Erelu Kuti of Lagos is ranked third in the kingdom's order of precedence. She serves as regent when the "stool" of the king, or Oba of Lagos, is vacant. As part of the coronation ceremonies for a new oba, she also publicly blesses the candidate prior to his installation. For these reasons, she is regarded as the queen mother of the realm.

Incumbent
The current Erelu Kuti of Lagos is Oloye Abiola Dosunmu, a princess of that kingdom. A direct descendant of Oba Dosunmu, she has held the chieftaincy for more than forty years.

See also
 Iyalode
 Iyoba
 Queen mothers in Africa

References 

Lagos
Yoruba royal titles
Yoruba words and phrases
Women in Nigeria
Yoruba politics
Noble titles
African traditional governments
African noble titles